The 1993 season of 2. deild karla was the 28th season of third-tier football in Iceland.

Standings

References

2. deild karla seasons
Iceland
Iceland
3